Chibwe may refer to:

Chibwe Creek, a river in Kachin State, Burma (Myanmar)
Chipwi (also Chibwe), a town in Kachin State
Chibwe Township, a township in Kachin State
Chibwe Dam, a dam on the N'Mai River in Kachin State
Chibwe Creek Dam, a dam on the N'Mai River
Chileshe Chibwe, a Zambian football (soccer) player